Daisy Pirovano (born 19 December 1977) is an Italian politician who is currently a member of the Senate of the Republic from Lega Nord.

References

See also 

 List of members of the Italian Senate, 2018-

Living people
1977 births
21st-century Italian politicians
21st-century Italian women politicians
Lega Nord politicians
Senators of Legislature XVIII of Italy
20th-century Italian women
Women members of the Senate of the Republic (Italy)